Aloysio José Leal Penna, SJ (February 7, 1933 – June 19, 2012) was the Roman Catholic archbishop of the Roman Catholic Archdiocese of Botucatu, Brazil.

Penna was ordained into the priesthood in 1963, was named a bishop in 1984 and retired in 2008.  Archbishop Penna died on June 19, 2012 at the age of 79

Notes

21st-century Roman Catholic archbishops in Brazil
1933 births
2012 deaths
20th-century Roman Catholic archbishops in Brazil
Roman Catholic bishops of Bauru
Roman Catholic bishops of Paulo Afonso